Eric D. Marcotte (born August 2, 1980) is an American professional racing cyclist, who last rode for UCI Professional Continental team . In 2014 he won the United States National Road Race Championships. He is originally from Marquette, Michigan. He lives and works as a chiropractor in Scottsdale, Arizona. In October 2015  announced that Marcotte would join them for the 2016 season.

Major results

2010
 1st Overall El Tour de Tucson 109-mile
 1st Stage 2 Valley of the Sun Stage Race
2011
 1st Overall El Tour de Tucson 111-mile
 1st Stage 3 Valley of the Sun Stage Race
2012
 1st Overall El Tour de Tucson 111-mile
 2nd Overall Valley of the Sun Stage Race
1st Stage 2
 1st Stage 3 Joe Martin Stage Race
 1st Stage 3 Tulsa Tough
2013
 3rd Overall Nature Valley Grand Prix
2014
 1st  Road race, National Road Championships
 1st Stage 1 Vuelta a la Independencia Nacional
 6th Overall Grand Prix Cycliste de Saguenay
 8th Bucks County Classic
 10th Winston-Salem Cycling Classic
2015
 1st  Criterium, National Road Championships
 2nd  Road Race, Pan American Games
2016
 1st Stage 4 Tour of the Gila
 2nd Winston Salem Cycling Classic
 2nd The Reading 120
 8th Philadelphia International Cycling Classic

References

External links
 

Living people
1980 births
American cycling road race champions
American male cyclists
American chiropractors
Pan American Games medalists in cycling
Pan American Games silver medalists for the United States
Cyclists at the 2015 Pan American Games
Medalists at the 2015 Pan American Games